David Baker (born 30 December 1965) is an English former professional cyclist, who competed in cyclo-cross and mountain bike racing.

Biography

Baker, from Dronfield, Derbyshire, began riding cyclo-cross with Norton Wheelers. He moved to Ace Racing Team where he and teammate Tim Gould dominated cyclo-cross for years. In the late 1980s, Baker and Gould tried small mountain bike races, progressing to Mountain Bike Club events which were then a national series. The British Mountain Bike Federation began in the early 1990s; Baker won the national series on numerous occasions, along with national championships. In 1993, he won the UK round of the Grundig Mountain Bike World Cup at Newnham Park, near Plymouth. He came 15th for Britain at the 1996 Atlanta Olympics. Two years later he retired with heart problems.

In 2009, he was inducted into the British Cycling Hall of Fame.

Major results
1992
 1st  National XC Championships
 1st Overall National Points Series
 3rd  UCI World XC Championships
1993
 1st  National XC Championships
 UCI World Cup
1st Plymouth
1994
 1st  National XC Championships

References

External links

Living people
Cyclo-cross cyclists
Cyclists from Yorkshire
Cross-country mountain bikers
Sportspeople from Sheffield
1965 births
Olympic cyclists of Great Britain
Cyclists at the 1996 Summer Olympics